Mates or  Maten  is a 1999 Dutch TV film directed by Pieter Verhoeff.

Cast
Kees Boot	... 	Theo Pals
Elsie de Brauw		
Hans Breetveld	... 	Sergeant Frank Houtman
Erik de Bruyn		
Khaldoun Elmecky		
Thijs Feenstra		
Bert Geurkink		
Marc Hazewinkel		
Arend Jan Heerma van Voss		
Monic Hendrickx		
Marja Kok	... 	Moeder Winters
Merel Laseur		
Johan Leysen... 	Officier Blaak
Jacques Luijer		
Willem Nijholt	... 	Hoofdofficier Meesingh
Roef Ragas	... 	Rob
Victor Reinier		
Tjerk Risselada		
Ronald Top		
Wimie Wilhelm		
Helmert Woudenberg	... 	Vader Winters

External links 
 

Dutch television films
1999 films
1990s Dutch-language films
Films directed by Pieter Verhoeff
Films shot in the Netherlands